Giuseppe Carlo Vergani (fl. 1738–1741) was an Italian accountant and writer from Milan.

Life 

He was an official and a public professor of arithmetic and geometry.

Vergani's books were considered fundamental reads for whoever was interested in accounting.

Works

References 

18th-century Italian male writers
18th-century Italian mathematicians
Italian accountants
Writers from Milan